The Woodstock Navy-Vets are a junior hockey team based in Woodstock, Ontario, Canada.  They are members of the Provincial Junior Hockey League of the Ontario Hockey Association.

The team was known as the Woodstock Renegades for three seasons from 2007–08 to 2009–10.

The team was preceded by the Woodstock Warriors who were an OHA Junior B team in the Central and Western leagues from 1951–52 to 1961–62, winning the Sutherland Cup emblematic of Provincial Junior B Champions in the 1954–55 season with a team that included future NHL player and Hall of Famer Bobby Hull.

History
The Woodstock Navy-Vets were founded in 1966 and played in the OHA-C Group III (Intercounty Junior C Hockey League - IJCHL). In 1971–72 the Navy-Vets became a member of the Western Junior B Hockey League when the IJCHL disbanded before moving the following season to the Central Junior C Hockey League.  In 1976–77 the Navy Vets became a charter member of the new Southwestern Junior B Hockey League along with the London Diamonds, St. Thomas Colonels, Tillsonburg Mavericks, Simcoe Jets, and Brantford Penguins.  The SWJBHL folded after two seasons and the Navy Vets joined the Niagara & District Junior C Hockey League for the 1978–79 season where they played until 2012–13.
The OHA realigned the NDJHL and SOJHL Junior C leagues in the summer of 2013 and forming a new MWJCHL.  The Navy Vets were a member of the new league along with Norwich, New Hamburg, and Paris from the NDJHL West along with Ayr, Burford, Delhi, Tavistock and Wellesley from the SOJHL.
In the summer of 2016 with the eight leagues from Southern Ontario joining to create the single Provincial Junior Hockey League, the former leagues became divisions of the PJHL. The Midwestern League re-branded to the Pat Doherty Division and became members of the Central Conference.

1969: Championship season
The Navy-Vets won their only OHA Junior C championship in the 1968–69 season, eliminating Dresden 4 games-to-0 in the quarter-final and New Hamburg 4 games-to-1 in the semi-final before beating Oakville Blades in seven games in the final.

1984
After finishing in fourth place in the 1983–84 NDJCHL West regular season with a record of 13 wins, 9 losses, and 8 ties, the Navy-Vets played sixty-five games that season and six rounds of playoffs.  In the division quarter-finals, the Navy-Vets drew the New Hamburg Spirit 83's. The best-of-5 series went the distance, Woodstock taking it in the end 3-games-to-2.  In the division semi-final, the Navy-Vets then took on the Dundas Blues.  The Blues were tough early, but the Navy-Vets had all the momentum and took the series 4-games-to-2.  They next played the well rested and top ranked Norwich Merchants in the division final.  The Merchants, like the Blues, were tough early in the series but the Navy-Vets were tougher winning 4-games-to-2.  They next had to play the Stoney Creek Warriors in the Niagara District championship.  The Warriors were tough and dominated much of the play.  The series went back and forth, and ended up going to a final and deciding seventh game.  Woodstock fought hard and took Stoney Creek into overtime.  Early in the second overtime, Woodstock would break the hearts of the Stoney Creek faithful in their own arena and win 6–5.  From this point on, the Woodstock Sentinel-Review referred to the 1983–84 edition of this team as "The Cardiac Kids".  With the win, the Navy-Vets were catapulted into the OHA Junior C semi-finals.  Their opponents would be the Dresden Jr. Kings of the Great Lakes Junior C Hockey League.  Dresden took game one big, 10–4.  Game two went to Woodstock in double overtime (4–3) and game three in single overtime (8–6).  Dresden came back and put Woodstock's backs against the wall with 4–2 and 7–2 victories, leaving the Cardiac Kids in a do-or-die situation.  Woodstock responded and won 6–5 and 6–2 to win the series.  They then moved on to face the Penetang Kings of the Georgian Bay Junior C Hockey League in the provincial final.  Penetang had just knocked off the Bowmanville Eagles 4-games-to-3.  Unfortunately for the Cardiac Kids, the Kings had no intention of losing, taking the series in four games: 8–7 in overtime, 6–5, 9–6, and 9–1.  The fairy tale run was over for the Navy-Vets, as they walked away Niagara West champions, Niagara & District champions, and OHA Junior C finalists.

2002: OHA semi-finalists
The 2001–02 Navy Vets won 25 games and had 52 points to finish in 1st place in the West Division during the regular season by 10 points over rival Norwich Merchants.  They beat New Hamburg Firebirds in 6 games in the West Division Semi-Finals and then knocked off Norwich in 5 games to win the West Division title.  They then upset the East Division champ Chippawa Riverhawks, who had an identical season record as the Vets, in 6 games to win the Niagara District Junior C Hockey League championships and move on to the OHA Semi-Finals against the Great Lakes Junior C Hockey League champion Essex. The series was hard-fought with the Navy Vets finally succumbing in 4 games.
The team captured the enthusiasm of the city during their late season heroics with fan support building in numbers and noise with each playoff victory to a peak in the 2 games at Southwood Arena for the OHA SF that saw over 2000 fans at each game.
The Navy Vets were led up front by the trio of Jeremy Demarest, Chad Paton, and Matt Carey.  Demarest won the West Division scoring title with 62 points and a division-high 40 assists.  Demarest also was named Most Sportsmanlike in the West Division.  Forward Taylor Winkler was among the league leaders in hits. 
The blueline was anchored by Chris Corriveau, Scott Roode, and Sean McLaren.
The goaltending tandem of Mike Matika & Matt Richardson provided stellar goaltending all season finishing 2nd in the West Division in Goals Against.
The team was led by West Division Coach of the Year Scott Brooks.

2007: Renegades
On April 27, 2007, new team owner Bill McLeod announced that the team would be changing its name to the 'Woodstock Renegades', effective the start of the 2007–2008 season, ending a 41-year relationship with the Oxford County Naval Veterans Association. The team played its first game as the Woodstock Renegades in September 2007.

2010: Navy Vets return
On March 31, 2010, team owner Bill McLeod announced that the team would be adopting the Navy Vets moniker once again effective the start of the 2010–2011 season. Along with the name change would be a new look, including a new logo (pictured on the right).  However, on August 16, 2010, it was announced that the new logo would not be adopted and that the team would be using the original Navy Vets logo.

On August 17, 2010, it was announced that Bill McLeod had stepped down as team owner & GM/Head Coach and Jeff Morrison would take over as Director of Hockey Operations/GM/Head Coach.  In addition, it was announced that a process had begun to turn the team into a non-profit organization, returning the hockey team to its roots as a community-owned team.

2012: Coaching changes
On December 10, 2012, Jeff Morrison resigned as GM-head coach of the Navy Vets for personal reasons. Assistant Coach Mark Jones assumed the head coach position, but then resigned at the end of the month. Frank Mueller took over as GM-head coach in January 2013.

2013: Organizational changes
On April 15, 2013, a local group of Woodstock community members represented the Navy Vets as its board of directors.
On December 19, 2013, there was a coaching staff change with former Navy Vet Adam Wallace being named head coach replacing Frank Mueller and Bill Wallace and Geoff Killing being named assistant coaches replacing Rob Hutchison.

2015
The Navy Vets in the 2014–15 season had a 16-win improvement. Mike Gillespie led the team in scoring for the 2nd straight season and finished in 6th place in league scoring with 45 points on 26 goals.  He was named the MWJCHL Most Valuable Player.  Head Coach Adam Wallace was named the MWJCHL Coach of the Year for leading the team to its season.  Goalie Michael Roefs tied a team record with 3 shutouts and combined with rookie Jackson Swindells and AP North Davies for a team record total of 6 shutouts.  Captain Jake Schneider, Dylan Wettlaufer, and Justin Elms also finished in the league's top 25 scorers.  The team had an 8-game winning streak in November.  They finished in 5th place and took 4th place defending champion Paris Mounties to 7 games in the quarterfinals before their turn-around season came to an end.  Over 10000 fans came through the gate to watch the team for 23 games (20 reg.season & 3 playoff) this season - an average of 448 well over that of any season in the last decade.

2015-16: 50th anniversary season
The Navy Vets unveiled a new logo and jerseys for their 50th anniversary season.
The team held an Alumni night in December with many former Navy Vets returning for a celebration.
Woodstock also hosted the MWJCHL Showcase in January, with a Navy Vets Alumni Team playing a MWJCHL All-Star Team prior to the MWJCHL Prospects Game.

2016-17
The Navy Vets 16-yr old Andrew Bruder was named PJHL Doherty Division Rookie of the Year.

2017-18
The Navy Vets won 30 games for only the 4th time in their history.
Their season attendance total was 10504 for a 525 AVG during 40-game reg.season most in Doherty Division and 2nd in PJHL (only 3rd OHA Jr C team to reach 10000).
They also advanced to the semi-finals for the 1st time since 2010.

2019-20
The playoffs finals for the 2019–20 season were cancelled due to the COVID-19 pandemic, after the Vets had been eliminated in the semi-finals.

2021-22
The Navy Vets won the Doherty Division Regular Season Title for the 1st time in 20 years.  Captain Kyle Baker won the Doherty Scoring Title with 75 points (the most by a Vet since 1998) with a PJHL league-leading 50 assists and was named Doherty Division MVP.  Patrick Klazer led the division in scoring by a defenceman with 11 goals and 40 points, and Nolan Brett led all division rookies in scoring with 38 points, while Caden Bower (2nd) and Christian Pelley (9th) also finished in the Top-10 scorers.  Veteran overage goalie Keaghan Brett led the division with 17 wins.  The team passed the 10000 total attendance mark (500+ per game average) for the 4th straight season and 6th time in last 7 years) which was 2nd best in the PJHL.  But the promising season came to a disappointing end when they lost to New Hamburg in Game#7 of the semi-finals at home.

Jr. Vets
The logo for the "Jr. Vets" used by the Woodstock Minor Hockey Association teams was designed by Woodstock-based Graphic Designer, Bill Bowman.

Season-by-season record
Note: GP = Games Played, W = Wins, L = Losses, T = Ties, OTL = Overtime Losses, GF = Goals for, GA = Goals againstPlayoffs
2005 Lost in West Division semifinals
Simcoe Storm defeated Woodstock Navy Vets in 4-games-to-0 West Division semifinals.
2006 Lost in West Division semifinals
Simcoe Storm defeated Woodstock Navy Vets 4-games-to-0 in West Division semifinals.
2007 Lost in West Division finals
Woodstock Navy Vets defeated Simcoe Storm 4-games-to-3 in West Division semifinals.
Norwich Merchants defeated Woodstock Navy Vets 4-games-to-1 in West Division finals.
2008 Lost in West Division semifinals
New Hamburg Firebirds defeated Woodstock Navy Vets 4-games-to-2 in West Division semifinals.
2009 Lost in West Division finals
Woodstock Navy Vets defeated New Hamburg Firebirds 4-games-to-1 in West Division semifinals.
Norwich Merchants defeated Woodstock Navy Vets 4-games-to-2 in West Division finals.
2010 Lost in West Division semifinals
Woodstock Navy Vets received first-round bye.
Norwich Merchants defeated Woodstock Navy Vets 4-games-to-0 in West Division semifinals.
2011 Lost in West Division quarter-finals
Norwich Merchants defeated Woodstock Navy Vets 4-games-to-0 in West Division quarter-finals.
2012 Lost in West Division quarter-finals
New Hamburg Firebirds defeated Woodstock Navy Vets 4-games-to-0 in West Division quarter-finals.
2013 Lost in West Division quarter-finals
Paris Mounties defeated Woodstock Navy Vets 4-games-to-0 in West Division quarter-finals.
2015 Lost in MWJCHL quarter-finals
Paris Mounties defeated Woodstock Navy Vets 4-games-to-3 in MWJCHL quarter-finals.
2016 Lost in MWJCHL quarter-finals
Paris Mounties defeated Woodstock Navy Vets 4-games-to-2 in MWJCHL quarter-finals.
2017 Lost in PJHL Doherty Division quarter-finals
Wellesley Applejacks defeated Woodstock Navy Vets 4-games-to-2 in PJHL Doherty Division quarter-finals.
2018 Lost in PJHL Doherty Division semi-finals
Woodstock Navy Vets defeated Norwich Merchants 4-games-to-1 in PJHL Doherty Division quarter-finals.
Tavistock Braves defeated Woodstock Navy Vets 4-games-to-0 in PJHL Doherty Division semi-finals.
2022 Lost in PJHL Doherty Division semi-finals
New Hamburg Firebirds defeated Woodstock Navy Vets 4-games-to-3 in PJHL Doherty Division semi-finals.

Clarence Schmalz Cup appearances1969: Woodstock Navy-Vets defeated Oakville Blades  4-games-to-31984: Penetang Kings defeated Woodstock Navy-Vets 4-games-to-noneGeorge S. Dudley Trophy Super "C" appearances1970: Barrie Colts defeated Woodstock Navy-Vets 4-games-to-21971: Woodstock Navy-Vets defeated Kitchener Ranger B's 4-games-to-21973: Woodstock Navy-Vets defeated Kitchener Ranger B's 4-games-to-3 with 1 tie1974: Woodstock Navy-Vets defeated Owen Sound Salvagemen 4-games-to-none1975: Woodstock Navy-Vets defeated Owen Sound Salvagemen 3-games-to-none1976: Woodstock Navy-Vets defeated Brantford Penguins 4-games-to-none''

Notable alumni
 Bernie Nicholls
 Len Hachborn
 Mike Craig
 Ted Long (WHA)
 Bob Langdon (former NHL referee) 
 Brad Kovachik (current NHL linesman) 
 Brian Paton
 Dave MacQueen
 Adam Wallace

Woodstock born players (who never played for Navy Vets)
 Larry Mavety (WHA)
 Doug Shelton (NHL)
 Jake Muzzin (current NHL player)

References

External links
 

Ice hockey teams in Ontario
Niagara Junior C Hockey League teams
Ice hockey clubs established in 1966
Sport in Woodstock, Ontario